Phoenix Island, dubbed the Oriental Dubai, is an artificial archipelago consisting of two landmasses forming an island resort in Sanya, Hainan Province, China.

Description

These islands are located in the southeast part of Sanya Bay. The eastern island, nearest the shore is complete. The western island is currently under construction. It is connected the shore by a 395-metre bridge. The western island is similar in size and shape, and is connected to the eastern island by a short, narrow strip of land. The original concept design and master plan for the island was developed by Leisure Quest International, LLC (USA).

Development
The project's program was developed by Leisure Quest International (USA) as was the development's Conceptual Design and Master Plan.  The development was sold in 2006 to a Shanghai Developer. The design development of the project was undertaken by Beijing architectural firm MAD Studio, who won the contract in 2007, total investment in the project exceeds 3 billion RMB (approximately $464 million). It is due for completion in 2014.

Prices of luxury residential units on Phoenix Island range from 50,000 RMB to 100,000 RMB per square metre, (approximately $7,700 to $15,400 USD), comparable to high-end properties in Beijing and Shanghai. There has been recent reporting that property values are decreasing as businessmen and officials seek to sell off properties.

Google Earth imagery dated 21 February 2020 shows that the Western Island is being used by the China Coast Guard as a mooring for some of its larger ocean-going patrol vessels.

Components
The eastern island is divided into eight main sections, and includes:

 200-meter-high signature seven-star hotel
 Five-star hotel
 Five 28-storey buildings
 Six luxury apartment buildings
 Conference centre
 Ferry terminal
 Harbour for cruise ships
 Marina with 150 - 300 yachts berths
 Yacht clubhouse
 Restaurants
 Shopping complex
 Shopping street
 Sports and recreational area
 Theme park

See also
 Nanhai Pearl Artificial Island, an under-construction island in Haikou Bay
 Palm Islands

References

External links

 Official website
 Images

Islands of Hainan
Artificial islands of China
Resorts in China
Buildings and structures in Hainan
Sanya
Buildings and structures under construction in China
2014 establishments in China
Tourist attractions in Sanya